
The following is a list of Playboy Playmates of 1964, the 10th anniversary year of the publication.  Playboy magazine names its Playmate of the Month each month throughout the year.

January

Sharon Rogers (born November 19, 1942, in Seattle  is an American model and actress who was Playboy magazine's Playmate of the Month for its January 1964 issue. Her centerfold was photographed by Pompeo Posar. She also was on the cover of the November 1963 issue. She died at home on October 16, 2022.

February

Nancy Jo Hooper (born July 17, 1943) was an American model who was Playboy magazine's Playmate of the Month for its February 1964 issue. Her centerfold was photographed by Pompeo Posar. In a sidebar commentary in The Playmate Book, Posar revealed that he discovered that Nancy Jo was still a virgin in the midst of the Playboy photoshoot when he asked her for "a little bit more sexy look" and she replied, "I don't know anything about sex!"

Although her Playmate article was titled "Georgia Peach", she was actually from Spartanburg, South Carolina and had won or placed as First Runner Up in a number of beauty pageants in the Old South region before her appearance in Playboy.

March

Nancy Scott (born October 2, 1941) is an American model who was Playboy magazine's Playmate of the Month for its March 1964 issue. Her centerfold was photographed by Ron Vogel. She posed topless for the December 1979 Playboy pictorial "Playmates Forever!"

April

Laura Lynn Hale (born March 20, 1946, in London, England), known by the stage name Ashlyn Martin, is an American model and actress who was Playboy magazine's Playmate of the Month for its April 1964 issue. Her centerfold was photographed by Pompeo Posar and Mario Casilli. She also appeared in the July 1963 issue of Playboy. She also worked as a Bunny at the Chicago Playboy Club.

May

Terri Kimball (born October 5, 1944, in Fort Myers, Florida) is an American model who was Playboy magazine's Playmate of the Month for its May 1964 issue. Her centerfold was photographed by Pompeo Posar. She also worked at the Playboy Club in Chicago. Kimball's daughter Farrah Mancini also posed nude for Playboy.

June

Lori Winston (born August 24, 1944) is an American model who was Playboy magazine's Playmate of the Month for its June 1964 issue. Her centerfold was photographed by Edmund Leja.

July

Melba Ogle (born November 13, 1942) is an American model. She is best known as Playboy magazine's Playmate of the Month for its July 1964 issue. Her centerfold was photographed by Mario Casilli.

August

China Lee (born September 2, 1942) is an American model and actress. She was Playboys Playmate of the Month for the August 1964 issue. Her centerfold was photographed by Pompeo Posar. She was the first Asian American Playmate.

September

Astrid Schultz, known as Astrid Schulz (born September 12, 1939, in Heemstede) is a Dutch model and actress who was Playboy magazine's Playmate of the Month for the September 1964 issue. She's the first Dutch-born Playmate to appear in Playboy's American edition. Her centerfold was photographed by Mario Casilli.

October

Rosemarie Hillcrest (born January 5, 1943) is a British model who is best known as Playboy's Playmate of the Month for October 1964. According to The Playmate Book, Rosemarie was discovered by Playboy through unusual means: she needed an interview with a millionaire for the college newspaper she was writing for, so she traveled to the United States and went to the Playboy Mansion in Chicago where she persuaded Hugh Hefner to agree to an interview. During the interview, he asked her if she would be interested in becoming a Playmate. She has a brief appearance in the rowing galley scene in The Magic Christian. Hillcrest is also noteworthy for having the largest natural breast measurements of any Playmate.

November

Kai Brendlinger (born September 8, 1943, in Minneapolis, Minnesota) was Playboy magazine's Playmate of the Month for the November 1964 issue. Her centerfold was photographed by Pompeo Posar. Brendlinger was working as a Bunny at the Chicago Playboy Club when she appeared in the magazine's "Bunnies of Chicago" pictorial of August 1964. Her Playmate layout was published a few months later.

December

Jo Collins (birthname Janet Canoy, born August 5, 1945, in Lebanon, Oregon) is Playboy magazine's Playmate of the Month for December 1964 and Playmate of the Year for 1965. Her original pictorial was photographed by Mario Casilli.  She was married to the baseball player Bo Belinsky for five years (1970 to 1975).

See also
 List of people in Playboy 1960–1969

References

1964-related lists
1964
Playmates Of 1964